Mihman-e Shahr Soltaniyeh (also Romanized as Mīhmān-e Shahr Solṭānīyeh) is a village in Soltaniyeh Rural District, Soltaniyeh District, Abhar County, Zanjan Province, Iran. At the 2006 census, its population was 28, in 10 families.

References 

Populated places in Abhar County